According to the Greater Lexington Chamber of Commerce, the largest employers in Lexington-Fayette County, Kentucky are:

Other large employers in Lexington include:

Ceradyne
GE Lighting
Georgia-Pacific (Dixie Cups)
Jif
Tempur Sealy International

See also
Old Kentucky Chocolates, chocolate retail store founded by Don Hurt

References

Economy of Lexington, Kentucky